Macroplea is a genus of beetle of the subfamily Donaciinae in the family of leaf beetles.

Description
The body color is not metallic. Their paws are longer than their crus, claw segment very long, one and a half to two times higher than the rest of the body. Outer apical angle of elytron extended into a spike.

Species
Certain types:
Macroplea appendiculata  (Panzer, 1794)
Macroplea japana (Jacoby, 1885)
Macroplea mutica (Fabricius, 1792)
Macroplea pubipennis (Reuter, 1875)
Macroplea skomorokhovi (Medvedev, 2006)

References

Chrysomelidae genera
Donaciinae
Taxa named by George Samouelle